Mahtab Parsamehr (born February 20, 1989, in Iran, Tehran. She started Archery when she was 18 years old. After 1 year she got her first medal in Iran national Indoor championship and she invited to the Iran Archery National Team. She got 2 Medals in her first international competitions (Vietnam Asian Games 2009). She is the current World Archery number seven in women's compound archery. The highest ranking she has reached is the third position, which she reached for the last time in April 2012.

Palmares

2009
Asian indoor Games 
individual Compound Women 
Compound Women's Team, Vietnam
Asian Outdoor Championships 
Compound Women's Team, Bali

2010
 World Cup,Compound women's Team, Antalya
 World University Championships, Compound women's Team, Shenzhen
 World University Championships, COMPOUND Mixed Team, Shenzhen

2011
 World Cup, Compound Women individual, Antalya
 World Cup, Compound Women's Team , Antalya
 World Outdoor Championships, women's team, Turin
4th, World Outdoor Championships, individual, Turin
4th, World Outdoor Championships, mixed team, Turin
4th, World Outdoor Championships, Individual, Salt Lake City
6th, Summer Universiade, women's team, Shenzhen
9th, Summer Universiade, individual, Shenzhen
8th, World Cup Final, individual, Istanbul
4th, Asian Outdoor Championships, women's team, Tehran
9th, Asian Outdoor Championships, individual, Tehran

2014
3D GP, Kemer 
Individual Compound Women

2017
GA State indoor Championships
Compound Women Individual, Georgia USA
GA State Field Archery championship 
 Compound Women Individual, Georgia USA

2018
50th US National indoor competitions
Compound Women Individual, Georgia USA

2019
GA Cup Competition 
Compound Women Individual, Georgia USA

References

External links
 

Iranian female archers
Living people
1989 births
World Archery Championships medalists
Islamic Solidarity Games competitors for Iran
Islamic Solidarity Games medalists in archery
Sportspeople from Tehran
21st-century Iranian women